Harrison Morales Ruiz (born June 20, 1986) is a Colombian former professional footballer who played as a centre-back.

He was one of the players who took part in Colombia national under-20 football team that won the Sudamericana and went to the 2005 FIFA World Youth Championship. He also played for Colombia at the 2003 FIFA U-17 World Championship.

References

External links
Profile at GolGolGol.net

1986 births
Living people
Colombian footballers
Association football central defenders
Colombia under-20 international footballers
Categoría Primera A players
Deportes Quindío footballers
Boca Juniors de Cali footballers